Brockway is an unincorporated community in Douglas County, Oregon, United States, on Oregon Route 42, about nine miles southwest of Roseburg.

Originally known as Civil Bend, referring to the "...boisterous activity of visitors to the horseraces," the name was changed in 1889 when postal authorities objected to a name with two words. "Brockway" was chosen in honor of local farmer and pioneer B. B. Brockway.

Benjamin Brockway
Benjamin Benson Brockway (1829 - 1915) was an Oregon Trail pioneer of 1852 from New York. He began farming in the Lookingglass Valley.

References 

Unincorporated communities in Douglas County, Oregon
1889 establishments in Oregon
Populated places established in 1889
Unincorporated communities in Oregon